Arnold Sutermeister (July 11, 1830 – May 3, 1907) was a Swiss-born contractor in the West of United States (business in Fort Wayne and Kansas City). Sutermeister was also a Captain in the American Civil War, where he commanded an artillery battery in the Western Theater.

Early life 

Arnold Sutermeister was born in Zofingen, Switzerland on July 11, 1830. He studied architecture in Bern and Basel. After his father's death (in 1840) he came to Boston in 1846 with his mother and sister. He moved to Fort Wayne, Indiana in 1857, where he worked as a mathematics teacher. In 1860 he married Louise Louise Johanna Leibnitz (1836–1906).

Civil War 
When the American Civil War began Sutermeister joined the Union army as Captain of the 11th Independent Battery Indiana Light Artillery, which he had recruited in Fort Wayne, on December 17, 1861. He commanded the battery for three years. Serving in the Western Theater in 1862 and 1863, he fought in the Siege of Corinth, the Battle of Chickamauga, and in the Chattanooga Campaign, specifically at the battles of Orchard Knob and Missionary Ridge. His battery won special distinction at Chickamauga.

During the Atlanta Campaign in 1864, Sutermeister served on the staff of Major-general George H. Thomas and commanded the siege artillery of the Army of the Cumberland. He also saw action in the following battles: Buzzard's Roost, Resaca, Dallas, New Hope Church, Kenesaw Mountain, and Atlanta. He is favourably mentioned in the report of Brigadier-general John M. Brannan to Thomas dated September 14, 1864:

Sutermeister was also a talented draughtsman, and often sent drawings of the battlefield home to his wife. He was mustered out with his unit on January 7, 1865, and returned to civilian life.

Later life 
After the war ended Sutermeister went back to Fort Wayne and then moved to Kansas City, Missouri, where he started a construction business. He died on May 3, 1907, in his seventy-seventh year, and was buried in Elmwood Cemetery. He left an estate valued at $15,000. 

Among Sutermeister's eight children were: Arnold Henry Sutermeister (1869–1918); Paul Arthur, the grandfather of Martha L. Ludwig; and Charles Oscar (1867–1937), the father of Robert A. Sutermeister.

Personal life 
In 1860 Sutermeister married Louise Leibnitz at the house of Hugh McCulloch.

References

Further reading
 Conard, Howard L., ed. (1901). Encyclopedia of the History of Missouri. Vol. 4. New York, Louisville, St. Louis: The Southern History Company. p. 143.
 Hess, Earl J. (2022). Civil War Field Artillery: Promise and Performance on the Battlefield. Baton Rouge, LA: Louisiana State University Press.
 Sauerländer, Remigius (1909). Arnold Sutermeister, Architekt von Zofingen, Batteriekommandant im Amerik. Bürgerkrieg. Joh. Fehlmann.
 Stevenson, David; Scribner, Theodore T. (1866). Indiana's Roll of Honor. Vol. 2. Indianapolis, IN: A. D. Streight. pp. 529, 530, 533.
 Whitney, Carrie Westlake (1908). Kansas City, Missouri: Its History and Its People 1800–1908. Vol. 1. Kansas City, MO: S. J. Clarke Publishing Company. pp. 441, 442.
 Stone, 21. Stone Magazine Review Publishing Company, 1901. p. 463.

External links
 
 ″Sutermeister, Arnold Papers, 1850–1865″ at River Campus Libraries, University of Rochester

Union Army officers
Burials at Elmwood Cemetery (Kansas City, Missouri)
People from Zofingen
People of Missouri in the American Civil War
1830 births
1907 deaths